Cusick is a surname. Notable people with the surname include:

David Cusick (c.1780–c.1831), Tuscarora artist and the author of David Cusick's Sketches of Ancient History of the Six Nations (1828)
Fred Cusick (1918–2009), American ice hockey broadcaster who served as the Boston Bruins play-by-play announcer for 45 years
Henry Ian Cusick (born 1967), Scottish-Peruvian actor
Johnny Cusick (1916–?) English boxer 
Michael Cusick (born 1969), Democratic Party politician, member of the New York State Assembly from the 63rd District
Raymond Cusick (1928–2013), English art director and production designer
Richie Tankersley Cusick (born 1952), American writer
Suzanne Cusick (born 1954), American musicologist